Nogometni Klub Jadran Luka Ploče is a Croatian professional football club based in town of Ploče currently playing in the Treća HNL, the third division of Croatian football. Jadran Ploče played in the Croatian second division in the early 1990s.

Jadran qualified for the second round of the 2018 Croatian Cup, where they lost to NK Vinogradar 4–2.

Players

Current squad

Notable players
The players listed have all played for Jadran Ploče and received at least one international cap.
 Dragan Blatnjak
 Mišo Krstičević
 Hrvoje Vejić

References

External links
NK Jadran Luka Ploče at Nogometni magazin 

Football clubs in Croatia
Football clubs in Dubrovnik-Neretva County
Sport in Ploče
Association football clubs established in 1959
1959 establishments in Croatia